Die Tageszeiten (Times of the Day) is a choral composition written for male voice choir and orchestra by Richard Strauss (1864–1949),  TrV 256, Op. 76 (published 1928).  It consists of four movements: "The Morning", "Afternoon Peace", "The Evening" and "The Night". The lyrics are based on four poems of the same names by Joseph Eichendorff (1788–1857) from his collection Wanderlieder (Wanderers' songs). The work was premiered on 21 July 1928 with the Wiener Schubertbund (Vienna Schubert Society) and the Vienna Philharmonic as part of the Schubert centenary.

Composition history
On 1 May 1924, the male voice choir of the Wiener Schubertbund (Vienna Schubert Society) serenaded Strauss in honor of his sixtieth birthday outside his house on Mozart-Platz. The choirmaster, Viktor Keldorfer, took the opportunity to ask if Strauss might write a piece for the choir and suggested the poetry of Joseph Eichendorff as a possible text.

Eichendorff was a very popular Romantic poet whose songs had been set many times by composers, such as Hugo Wolf. Indeed, Strauss had used Eichendorff in earlier choral works and was to turn to Eichendorff twenty years later for one of his Four Last Songs, Im Abendrot, also about a time of the day. His response to Keldorfer's suggestion was to comment about the poet: "Good! Very good! He is a full blooded romanticist who is close to me".

The idea developed slowly in Strauss' mind, and Keldorfer heard nothing until in 1927 he received an invitation to visit Strauss at his home in Garmisch where Strauss showed him three of a four movement song cycle based on poems from Eichendorff's Wanderlieder ("Der Abend" was completed later that year). In this initial version, Strauss had composed an orchestral opening, a depiction of dawn leading to the first line of the poem "Fliegt der erste Morgenstrahl". Keldorfer suggested an alternative opening in which the choir sang a cappella using a verse from Eichendorf's poetic novella Die Glücksritter (The Fortune Seekers). Del Mar comments that the verse had been used previously by Hans Pfitzner, which might have put Strauss off. However, he duly obliged Keldorfer and replaced the orchestral introduction with the a cappella opening. Del Mar writes about Die Tageszeiten:Although the shape of the pieces arise from the form of the Eichendorff poems, the style of the music depends on the instrumental textures ... whilst the vocal lines adopt a relatively  subordinate role.  The peaceful second movement has its roots firmly planted in German folk-song, though its conventionality is qualified by Strauss' calculated indifference to the rules of strict part writing.  the movement conjures up both the sultry heat and provides an attractive contrast to the more vivacious movements which flank it ... The last two songs run continuously, Evening merging appropriately into Night with haunting suggestions of distant storms.  The final song is a peaceful and attractive Nocturne which opens with a horn solo and has a middle section filled with birdsong and atmospheric orchestration. The work ends with a hymn like repetition of the final verse.

Strauss did not conduct the premiere in Vienna on 21 July 1928.  He did conduct the piece with the Wiener Schubertbund the next year, on 23 January 1929.

Lyrics
Richard Strauss based the lyrics for Die Tageszeiten on the following poems by Joseph Eichendorff (1788–1857):

Introduction (a cappella)

Morning

Afternoon Rest

Evening

Night

Choir and orchestra

The male voice choir is scored for two tenor parts and two bass parts. The orchestra consists of:
 Two flutes, two oboes, two clarinets, bass clarinet, two bassoons, double bassoon.
 Four french horns, two trumpets, three trombones, tuba
 Timpani
 Harp
 Organ (Night)
 Strings

Clemens Krauss made an arrangement for mixed choir (SATB) after the composer's death, which was premiered with the Vienna Philharmonic on 2 March 1952.

References

Sources
 Richard Strauss Edition: Volume 30 Works for Choir and Orchestra, Peters Edition, Richard Strauss Verlag, Vienna (2004), ISMN 9790014106997.
 Del Mar, Norman, Richard Strauss. A Critical Commentary on his Life and Works, Volume 2, London: Faber and Faber (2009)[1969] (second edition), .
 Lodata, Suzanne, The Challenge of the Choral Works, chapter 11 in Mark-Daniel Schmid, Richard Strauss Companion, Praeger Publishers, Westfield CT, (2003), .
 Trenner, Franz (2003) Richard Strauss Chronik, Verlag Dr Richard Strauss Gmbh, Wien, .

External links 
 Eichendorff texts and translations online at German Project Gutenberg 
 Lieder.net, original Eichendorff texts and translations into several languages.

Choral compositions
1928 compositions
Compositions by Richard Strauss
Adaptations of works by Joseph von Eichendorff